The 1978 LAV HS 748 accident occurred on 3 March 1978 when Hawker Siddeley HS 748 YV-45C, of LAV (Línea Aeropostal Venezolana), crashed into the sea close to Caracas-Maiquetía Airport (CCS/SVMI), Venezuela. All 46 on board were killed.

Accident
Two minutes after takeoff from Caracas-Maiquetía Airport (CCS/SVMI), on a domestic flight to Cumaná Airport (CUM/SVCU) the pilot declared an emergency and said he was returning to the airport due to problems with an attitude indicator. The aircraft crashed into the sea killing all 43 passengers and three crew. Due to the depth of the water it was not possible to recover major parts of the aircraft.

References

External links
ASN accident report

Airliner accidents and incidents caused by instrument failure
Accidents and incidents involving the Hawker Siddeley HS 748
Aviation accidents and incidents in 1978
1978 in Venezuela
Aviation accidents and incidents in Venezuela